Washford Radio Museum has been re-located to 'The Radio Museum' at the former Anchor Inn, 5, Anchor Street, Watchet, Somerset, TA23 0AZ.

References

External links
 Washford Radio Museum - official site and photos

Museums in Somerset
Telecommunications museums
Grade II listed buildings in West Somerset
Grade II listed museum buildings